Ahmad Al-Shamy (born 10 October 1965) is a Syrian wrestler. He competed in the men's freestyle 90 kg at the 1988 Summer Olympics.

References

External links
 

1965 births
Living people
Syrian male sport wrestlers
Olympic wrestlers of Syria
Wrestlers at the 1988 Summer Olympics
Place of birth missing (living people)
Asian Games medalists in wrestling
Wrestlers at the 1990 Asian Games
Asian Games bronze medalists for Syria
Medalists at the 1990 Asian Games